A statue of American basketball player Elgin Baylor by artists Omri Amrany and Gary Tillery is installed outside Los Angeles' Crypto.com Arena, in the U.S. state of California. The bronze sculpture was unveiled in 2018. Baylor played for the Los Angeles Lakers and was the longtime general manager of the Los Angeles Clippers.

References 

2018 establishments in California
2018 sculptures
Bronze sculptures in California
Outdoor sculptures in Greater Los Angeles
Sculptures of African Americans
Sculptures of men in California
South Park (Downtown Los Angeles)
Statues in Los Angeles
Statues of sportspeople